Hydrogen deuteride is a diatomic molecule substance or compound of two isotopes of hydrogen: the majority isotope 1H (protium) and 2H (deuterium). Its proper molecular formula is H2H, but for simplification, it is usually written as HD.

Preparation and occurrence
In the laboratory it is produced by treating sodium hydride with deuterated water:

Hydrogen deuteride is a minor component of naturally occurring molecular hydrogen. It is one of the minor but noticeable components of the atmospheres of all the giant planets, with abundances from about 30 ppm to about 200 ppm. HD has also been found in supernova remnants, and other sources.

Radio emission spectra 
HD and H2 have very similar emission spectra, but the emission frequencies differ.

The frequency of the astronomically important J = 1-0 rotational transition of HD at 2.7 THz has been measured with tunable FIR radiation with an accuracy of 150 kHz.

References

Further reading
Spitzer observations of hydrogen deuteride

Hydrogen
Hydrogen compounds
Deuterated compounds